The  is a title that was originally promoted by the Mexican lucha libre promotion Universal Wrestling Association. After the UWA closed in 1995 the title was defended on the Mexican independent circuit and in the Puerto Rican promotion World Wrestling Council. In 2014, the title was revived by Japanese promotion Tenryu Project. In 2016, the title moved to the Pro-Wrestling Freedoms promotion.

As it is a professional wrestling championship, the championship is not won not by actual competition, but by a scripted ending to a match determined by the bookers and match makers. On occasion the promotion declares a championship vacant, which means there is no champion at that point in time. This can either be due to a storyline, or real life issues such as a champion suffering an injury being unable to defend the championship, or leaving the company.

There have been a total of 46 reigns and five vacancies shared between 30 different champions. The title is currently held by Hiroshi Yamato.

Title history

Combined reigns 

{| class="wikitable sortable" style="text-align: center"
!Rank
!Wrestler
!No. ofreigns
!Combineddays
|-
!1
| Yuya Susumu || 3 || 808
|-
!2
| Enrique Vera || 3 ||style="background-color:#bbeeff"| 661¤
|-
!3
| Kengo || 2 || 570
|-
!4
| Shu El Guerrero || 1 || 507
|-
!5
|  || 3 || 447
|-
!6
| The Killer || 3 || 381
|-
!7
| Tatsuhito Takaiwa || 1 || 363
|-
!8
| Nagase Kancho || 1 || 301
|-
!9
| Dr. Wagner Jr. || 2 || 274
|-
!10
| Kenichiro Arai || 1 || 271
|-
!11
| Kotaro Nasu || 1 || 252
|-
!12
|  || 2 || 244
|-
!13
| Kamui || 2 || 235
|-
!14
|  || 1 || 138
|-
!15
| Lobo || 3 || 112
|-
!16
| The Winger || 1 || 94
|-
!17
| Astro de Oro || 2 || 91
|-
!18
|  || 1 || 47
|-
!19
| Minoru Fujita || 1 || 27
|-
!20
| Miedo Extremo || 1 || 20
|-
!21
| style="background-color:#FFE6BD"|Hiroshi Yamato † || 1 || +
|-
!22
| Pablo Marquez || 2 ||style="background-color:#bbeeff"| 15¤
|-
!23
| Brahman Kei || 1 || 12
|-
!24
| Crash Holly || 1 || 1
|-
!rowspan=6|25
| Aero Flash || 1 ||style="background-color:#bbeeff"| N/A¤
|-
| Blue Demon Jr. || 1 ||style="background-color:#bbeeff"| N/A¤
|-
|  || 1 ||style="background-color:#bbeeff"| N/A¤
|-
|  || 1 ||style="background-color:#bbeeff"| N/A¤
|-
| Mr. Jack || 1 ||style="background-color:#bbeeff"| N/A¤
|-
| Negro Navarro || 1 ||style="background-color:#bbeeff"| N/A¤
|-

Footnotes

References

Universal Wrestling Association championships
Junior heavyweight wrestling championships
World professional wrestling championships